Finschhafen Airport is a general aviation airport in Morobe Province, Papua New Guinea. .  It is located on the south-east tip of Huon Peninsula at Finschafen. A half mile inland, parallel to Schneider Harbor, with Dregerhaffen to the south-east. It has no scheduled commercial airline service.

History
The airport was built during World War II in late 1943 by the United States Army 807th and 808th Aviation Engineer Battalions along with the 60th Naval Construction Battalion constructed a 6,000' x 100' coral and steel matting single runway running NNW to SSE. The tower was code named 'Harvest'. In mid-November 1943, the Seabees performed rough grading on the northern end of the strip, and crushed coral for the entire area. On 5 January the 808th departed, and the 60th CB completed the airfield, building fighter and medium bomber hardstands, mostly located to the north, with more to the east and a few on the southern side of the runway.  Many aircraft shipped from the United States were assembled at Finschafen and then flown to other airfields for operations.

Allied units assigned to Finschhafen
 86th Fighter Wing		        		(1 May-1 August 1944)
 8th Fighter Group		(23 December 1943 – 20 February 1944)
 Headquarters, 35th, 36th Fighter Squadrons, P-40 Warhawk, P-47 Thunderbolt
 49th Fighter Group		(19 April-17 May 1944)
 Headquarters, 7th Fighter Squadron, P-40 Warhawk
 348th Fighter Group	(16 December 1943 – 29 March 1944)
 Headquarters, 340th, 341st, 342d Fighter Squadrons, P-47 Thunderbolt

 317th Troop Carrier Group	(April–June 1944)
 Headquarters, 319th Troop Carrier Squadron, C-47 Skytrain
 22d Troop Carrier Squadron, (375th Troop Carrier Group), C-47 Skytrain
 8th Combat Cargo Squadron, (2d Combat Cargo Group), C-46 Commando
 418th Night Fighter Squadron, (380th Bombardment Wing), (28 March-12 May 1944)

At the war's end, millions of dollars of equipment both new and used was bulldozed into a huge holes in the area and abandoned.

See also

 USAAF in the Southwest Pacific

References

 Maurer, Maurer (1983). Air Force Combat Units Of World War II. Maxwell AFB, Alabama: Office of Air Force History. .

Airports in Papua New Guinea
Airfields of the United States Army Air Forces in Papua New Guinea
Morobe Province
Airfields of the United States Army Air Forces Air Transport Command in the South West Pacific Theater
Airports established in 1943